Semperdon heptaptychius is a species of small, air-breathing land snails, terrestrial pulmonate gastropod mollusks in the family Charopidae. This species is endemic to Guam.

References

Fauna of Guam
Semperdon
Gastropods described in 1894
Taxonomy articles created by Polbot